Marko Šuler (born 9 March 1983) is a Slovenian retired football player who played as a centre-back. Besides Slovenia, he has played in Belgium, Israel, and Poland.

International career
Šuler earned his first cap for Slovenia in a friendly match against Hungary on 26 March 2008. He scored his first goal on 20 August 2008 in a friendly against Croatia.

Career statistics

International 
Scores and results list Slovenia's goal tally first, score column indicates score after each Šuler goal.

Honours
Dravograd
Slovenian Second League: 2001–02

Gorica
Slovenian First League: 2004–05, 2005–06

Gent
Belgian Cup: 2009–10

Hapoel Tel Aviv 
Israel State Cup: 2011–12

Legia Warsaw
Polish Championship: 2012–13
Polish Cup: 2012–13

Maribor
Slovenian First League: 2013–14, 2014–15, 2016–17, 2018–19
Slovenian Cup: 2015–16
Slovenian Supercup: 2014

References

External links

Player profile at NZS 

1983 births
Living people
Sportspeople from Slovenj Gradec
Slovenian footballers
Association football defenders
Slovenian expatriate footballers
Expatriate footballers in Austria
Slovenian expatriate sportspeople in Austria
Slovenian Second League players
Slovenian PrvaLiga players
NK Dravograd players
ND Gorica players
Expatriate footballers in Belgium
Slovenian expatriate sportspeople in Belgium
Belgian Pro League players
K.A.A. Gent players
Expatriate footballers in Israel
Slovenian expatriate sportspeople in Israel
Israeli Premier League players
Hapoel Tel Aviv F.C. players
Expatriate footballers in Poland
Slovenian expatriate sportspeople in Poland
Legia Warsaw players
Ekstraklasa players
NK Maribor players
Slovenia youth international footballers
Slovenia under-21 international footballers
Slovenia international footballers
2010 FIFA World Cup players